American actress Michelle Pfeiffer has received numerous awards and nominations throughout her extensive career, including one Golden Globe Award from eight nominations, two Screen Actors Guild Award nominations, one Primetime Emmy Award nomination, one British Academy Film Award from two nominations, and three Academy Award nominations. Pfeiffer has received three Academy Award nominations to date: Best Supporting Actress for Dangerous Liaisons (1988), and Best Actress in The Fabulous Baker Boys (1989) and Love Field (1992). 

Additionally, she has been awarded by a various of film critics associations including, Best Actress awards from the National Board of Review, the National Society of Film Critics, the New York Film Critics Circle, the Chicago Film Critics Association and the Los Angeles Film Critics Association, as well as Best Supporting Actress awards from the Kansas City Film Critics Circle and the San Diego Film Critics Society. 

In 2017, Pfeiffer received her first Primetime Emmy Award nomination for her performance in HBO made for television film The Wizard of Lies (2017) portraying Ruth Madoff. That same year, it was announced that she had also received a Golden Globe Award for Best Supporting Actress – Series, Miniseries or Television Film nomination for the role. In 2021, she won the Canadian Screen Award for Best Actress at the 9th Canadian Screen Awards, for her work in French Exit.

Major associations

Academy Awards

British Academy Film Awards

Golden Globe Awards

Primetime Emmy Awards

Screen Actors Guild Awards

Miscellaneous awards

References

External links
 Michelle Pfeiffer – Awards at the Internet Movie Database

Lists of awards received by American actor